Prospect Heights Historic District is a national historic district in Prospect Heights, Brooklyn, New York City.  It consists of 305 contributing buildings built between 1865 and about 1900.  The district is almost exclusively residential and includes a variety of single family rowhouses and multiple dwellings.  They are in a variety of architectural styles popular in the late-19th century.

It was listed on the National Register of Historic Places in 1983.

References

Prospect Heights, Brooklyn
Historic districts on the National Register of Historic Places in Brooklyn
New York City designated historic districts
New York City Designated Landmarks in Brooklyn